Whitehill Wood is a wood and megalithic stone circle in Aberdeenshire, Scotland, located off the B9025 road between Aberchirder and Turriff and between the hamlets of Bogton and Laithers. It is one of the Aberdeenshire circles, which according to Sir Norman Lockyer were built around 1200 BC. However, Historic Environment Scotland describes it as 4500 years old. it is protected as a scheduled monument.

References

Whitehill Stone Circle
Archaeological sites in Aberdeenshire
Scheduled Ancient Monuments in Aberdeenshire